The Sol Prymus (English: Primus, meaning Primary) is a Brazilian single-place paraglider that was designed and produced by Sol Paragliders of Jaraguá do Sul starting in the mid-2000s. It remained in production as the Prymus 4 in 2016.

Design and development
The Prymus was designed as a beginner to intermediate glider. By 2016 the design had progressed through four generations of models, the Prymus 1, 2, 3 and 4, each improving on the last. The models are each named for their relative size.

The Prymus 4 has a top and bottom wing surface made from WTX 40 - 40 g/m2 fabric, with wing ribs made from Pro Nyl 42 g/m2 rip stop covered with poliuretano and BT technology reinforcements. The lines are 1.1, 1.5 and 2.1 mm Cousin Technora Superaram, while the risers are Fitanew 15 x 2,0 mm Flat Multi 1600 kg strapping. The carabiners are Ansung Precision 4mm 800 kg and the pulleys are made by SOL.

Variants

Prymus 1
Prymus 1 S
Small-sized model for lighter pilots. The glider model is AFNOR Standard certified.
Prymus 1 M
Mid-sized model for medium-weight pilots. The glider model is AFNOR Standard certified.
Prymus 1 L
Large-sized model for heavier pilots. The glider model is AFNOR Standard certified.

Prymus 4
Prymus 4 S
Small-sized model for lighter pilots. The glider model is Deutscher Hängegleiterverband e.V. (DHV) LTF/EN A certified.
Prymus 4 M
Mid-sized model for medium-weight pilots. The glider model is DHV LTF/EN A certified.
Prymus 4 L
Large-sized model for heavier pilots. The glider model is DHV LTF/EN A certified.
Prymus 4 XL
Extra large-sized model for even heavier pilots. The glider model is DHV LTF/EN A certified.

Specifications (Prymus 1 M)

References

Prymus
Paragliders